The Reformed Church is a church in Uileacu Şimleului, Romania, built between 1260 and 1300.

Gallery

References

External links
 Biserica reformata unicat la Uileacu Simleului

Historic monuments in Sălaj County
Reformed churches in Romania
Churches in Sălaj County
Churches completed in 1300